Cazenovia is a village located in the Town of Cazenovia in Madison County, New York, United States. As of the 2010 census, the village had a population of 2,835. Cazenovia is within a half hour of Syracuse, New York. The village is located on US Route 20 and New York State Route 13, and is home to Cazenovia College.

History 

Cazenovia was established in 1794 by John Lincklaen, a young Dutch naval officer who purchased the town under the auspices of the Holland Land Company. Some of the first buildings established in Cazenovia were what is now the Presbyterian Church and the company store. The town is named after Theophilus Cazenove, an agent with the land company.

The village was incorporated in 1810 and was the first county seat (until 1817).
Many of the village's historic buildings are encompassed by the Albany Street Historic District and Cazenovia Village Historic District.  Also listed on the National Register of Historic Places is the Lehigh Valley Railroad Depot.

The most famous event in Cazenovia's history was the 1850 Fugitive Slave Convention, organized by abolitionist Gerrit Smith and chaired by former slave Frederick Douglass to consider how to react to  Fugitive Slave Act of 1850, which passed days later.

The Lorenzo New York State Historic Site was listed in the National Register of Historic Places in July 1970. This land, located off Route 13 (Rippleton Road), now belongs to the NY State Historic Trust after being bought from the previous owner, George Ledyard, upon his death. There is a school house, mansion, farmhouse, and a landscaped garden that guests can tour throughout the year by appointment or during regular hours.

In 2005, the Cazenovia High School Academic Decathlon team won the school's first state title, sending the team to the national competition in Chicago. The team retained its state title the following four years, traveling to national competitions in San Antonio, Texas, in 2006, Honolulu, Hawaii, in 2007, Anaheim, California, in 2008, and Memphis, Tennessee, in 2009.

On March 31, 2021 New York State legalized recreational cannabis. Villages can't limit a resident’s right to possess or consume weed. However, the villages can prohibit retail outlets from selling it. On July 1, 2021, the village board voted unanimously to opt out of allowing retail cannabis sales in the village. It was one of the first villages in the state to opt out.

Demographics

As of the census of 2000, there were 2,614 people, 943 households, and 522 families residing in the village. The population density was 1,660.3 people per square mile (642.8/km2). There were 1,031 housing units at an average density of 654.8 per square mile (253.5/km2). The racial makeup of the village was 95.37% White, 2.41% Black or African American, 0.38% Native American, 0.54% Asian, 0.04%, 0.27% from other races, and 0.99% from two or more races. Hispanic or Latino of any race were 2.75% of the population.

There were 943 households, out of which 25.6% had children under the age of 18 living with them, 43.5% were married couples living together, 9.5% had a female householder with no husband present, and 44.6% were non-families. 38.8% of all households were made up of individuals, and 20.7% had someone living alone who was 65 years of age or older. The average household size was 2.17 and the average family size was 2.93.

In the village, the population was spread out, with 18.1% under the age of 18, 26.1% from 18 to 24, 19.9% from 25 to 44, 20.1% from 45 to 64, and 15.8% who were 65 years of age or older. The median age was 32 years. For every 100 females, there were 73.1 males. For every 100 females age 18 and over, there were 67.9 males.

The median income for a household in the village was $43,611, and the median income for a family was $61,750. Males had a median income of $45,662 versus $30,893 for females. The per capita income for the village was $23,424. About 2.8% of families and 7.0% of the population were below the poverty line, including 4.5% of those under age 18 and 8.5% of those age 65 or over.

Library
The Cazenovia Public Library is a public library located in the town of Cazenovia (village), New York, United States. As a library in Madison County it is a part of the Mid-York Library System. It is located at 100 Albany Street, Cazenovia, NY. In its original building it houses specimens and historical artifacts that have been generously donated to the library.

History 
The first incidence of a library in Cazenovia was started in 1828 by John Williams, a general store owner and merchant. His library “consisting of 200 vols.” were lent to the public for free. It was not until 1886 that the Cazenovia Library Society was formed. Societies like it maintained their libraries “through membership, lending fees, and gifts”

In 1890, Robert J. Hubbard purchased and donated a house for the library's use. Built in the Greek Revival style, it had been built in 1830 for John Williams. The ground floor of the house served as the main library building until a modern extension was built in 1996. Robert J. Hubbard also donated his collection of souvenirs from his 1894 Grand Tour trip. One of the most notable artifacts he brought back was an ancient Egyptian mummy.

People from Cazenovia
 Charles S. Fairchild (1842–1924), Attorney General of State of New York; U.S. Secretary of the Treasury.
 Ezra Greenleaf Weld (1801–1874), daguerrotypist.

See also
 Cazenovia College

References

External links
 Cazenovia Republican - Weekly Newspaper
 Cazenovia History links
 Cazenovia Chamber of Commerce

Villages in New York (state)
Syracuse metropolitan area
Populated places established in 1794
Villages in Madison County, New York
1794 establishments in New York (state)
Cazenovia, New York